The kubing is a type of Philippine jaw harp from bamboo found among the Maguindanaon and other Muslim and non-Muslim tribes in the Philippines and Indonesia. It is also called kobing (Maranao), kolibau (Tingguian), aru-ding (Tagbanwa), kuribaw (Ibanag and Itawes), aribao (Isneg),  aroding (Palawan), kulaing (Yakan), ulibaw (Kalinga), karombi (Toraja), yori (Kailinese) or Kulibaw. Ones made of sugar palm-leaf are called karinta (Munanese), ore-ore mbondu or ore Ngkale (Butonese).

The kubing is traditionally considered an intimate instrument, usually used as communication between family or a loved one in close quarters. Both genders can use the instrument, the females more infrequently than males who use it for short distance courtship.

See also
Jaw harp
Lamellophone

References

External links
"Grinnell College Musical Instrument Collection: Kubing", Grinnell.edu.

Idioglot guimbardes and jaw harps
Philippine musical instruments
Indonesian musical instruments